"Team" is a song by New Zealand singer-songwriter Lorde, taken from her debut studio album, Pure Heroine (2013). The song was released on 13 September 2013 as the album's third single in Australia and New Zealand by Universal Music New Zealand, and the second in the United States and the United Kingdom by Lava and Republic Records. The track was written by Lorde and Joel Little and produced by Little, with additional production from Lorde herself. "Team" is a hybrid of alternative pop and electro hop featuring synthesiser, bass and snare drum instrumentation over a handclap-based beat. Lyrically, the track is a "tribute to her friends and country".

"Team" was well received by contemporary critics, who praised its musical style, lyrical content and Lorde's vocal delivery on the track. The single garnered success on charts internationally, peaking at number 6 on the US Billboard Hot 100 and at number 3 on the Canadian Hot 100 chart. In Oceania, it peaked at number 19 in Australia and debuted and peaked at number 3 in New Zealand. "Team" was certified platinum by both the Australian Recording Industry Association and Recorded Music NZ.

A music video for the song was directed by Young Replicant and was released on 4 December 2013. Filmed in an abandoned building named Red Hook Grain Terminal in Red Hook, Brooklyn, the video's content was inspired by Lorde's dream of teenagers in their own world. Upon its release, the clip crashed Vevo's channel due to a high number of views. To promote "Team" and Pure Heroine, Lorde performed the song on several occasions, including on Late Show with David Letterman and at the ARIA Music Awards of 2013. It was later featured on a season 10 episode of Grey's Anatomy which aired in December 2013.

Background and composition
"Team" was written by Lorde and Joel Little while Lorde was travelling the world. The track was recorded, produced and mixed by Little at his Golden Age Studios in Morningside, Auckland, with Lorde providing additional production. The song was produced using the software Pro Tools. On 13 September 2013 "Team" was leaked, justifying an earlier rush out release. Within hours the audio was uploaded on YouTube and Universal Music New Zealand released the digital download single for sale in Australia and New Zealand. On 30 September 2013, the track was sent to US modern rock radio on 30 September 2013, and to US contemporary hit radio on 19 November 2013 by Lava and Republic Records. "Team" was also sent to US rhythmic contemporary radio on 6 January 2014.

"Team" is a hybrid of alternative pop and electro-hop. Written in the key of G-flat major, "Team" features synthesiser, bass, and snare drum instrumentation over a handclap-based beat. Amanda Dobbins of New York magazine and Maura Johnston of Spin likened the chorus of the song to that of Lana Del Rey's "Born to Die" (2011), while Drowned in Sounds Sammy Maine compared the beats to works produced by Timbaland for Missy Elliott. Lorde's vocal range spans from B♭2 to D♭5. The song moves at a tempo of 100 beats per minute.

Lyrically, "Team" is a "tribute to her friends and country". During an interview with Billboard, Lorde described the song as "her take on most modern music" and explained, "no one comes to New Zealand, no one knows anything about New Zealand, and here I am, trying to grow up and become a person." Lorde explained that the line "We live in cities you'll never see on screen" was "to be speaking for the minority" from small cities. She also expresses distaste in common contemporary popular music lyrics telling listeners to "put your hands in the air" through the verse "I'm kind of over getting told to throw my hands up in the air". Writer Lily Rothman for the magazine Time commented that the lyrics "we sure know how to run things" in "Team" were a response to the lyrics "we run things, things don’t run we" in Miley Cyrus' "We Can't Stop" (2013).

Reception

"Team" received critical acclaim from music critics. Brenna Ehrlich from MTV News lauded it as an "insanely catchy jam". The A.V. Club critic Kevin McFarland labelled "Team" as a "club-ready" and "sparkly thumper", while Nathan Jolly from The Music Network simply described it "interesting". John Murphy, in his review of Pure Heroine for musicOMH, commended the lyrics "I'm kinda over getting told to throw my hands up in the air" for being catchy. Marlow Stern writing for The Daily Beast listed "Team" as the fifth best song of 2013. In 2019, Uproxx named the song the thirteenth best song of the 2010s.

On 23 September 2013, "Team" debuted at number three on the New Zealand Singles Chart, becoming Lorde's third consecutive top-three single in the country following number-one singles "Royals" and "Tennis Court". Recorded Music NZ certified the single double platinum due to the sales figure of over 30,000 copies in the country. "Team" peaked at number nineteen on the Australian Singles Chart, and was certified double platinum by the Australian Recording Industry Association (ARIA).

Following its impact on US radio stations, "Team" debuted at number thirty-two on the Billboard Rock Airplay, and topped the chart on 7 October 2013. It also topped the Adult Top 40, and charted at number two on the Mainstream Top 40, number two on the Hot Rock Songs and number two on the Alternative Songs. On the Billboard Hot 100, "Team" peaked at number six, becoming her second US top-ten hit (following her debut number-one hit "Royals"). The song reached over two million in sales in the US by April 2014. By December 2014, "Team" had sold 2.45 million copies in the US. The single also reached number three on the Canadian Hot 100, and was certified double-platinum by Music Canada, which denotes 160,000 downloads.

Music video

The music video for "Team" was directed by Young Replicant. Filmed at the disused Red Hook Grain Terminal in Red Hook, Brooklyn, the video was inspired by Lorde's dream of "teenagers in their own world, a world with hierarchies and initiations, where the boy who was second in command had acne on his face, and so did the girl who was Queen". The director explained that Lorde was one of the "kids who have a unique look", which fitted the clip's "sad story" concept.

The video begins with shots of the ocean; The Daily Beast's editor Marlow Stern drew comparisons between the shots to Paul Thomas Anderson's drama film The Master (2012). The scene revealed an unseen city with ruins of factories on an island and full of teens "without any parental guidance". On Lorde's Facebook account, she further explained that world was "so different to anything anyone had ever seen, a dark world full of tropical plants and ruins and sweat". Inside the ruins, she is seen as the "self-anointed" queen of the city's citizens in a "blue, foliage-filled universe". Stern compared her image to that of The Hunger Games''' fictional character Katniss Everdeen. A young boy is transported to the island; following his arrival, he must joust on a motorbike to become a part of Lorde's "team". He loses; Lorde commented that "sometimes the person who loses is stronger".

On 4 December 2013, the video was released on Lorde's official Vevo channel on YouTube at 10 AM (NZDT). Lily Rothman from Time magazine compared the video for "Team" to Miley Cyrus' "We Can't Stop" music video for their same "mythical settings"a party ("We Can't Stop") and an island ("Team").

Live performances and other usage
On 12 November 2013, Lorde performed several songs from Pure Heroine during the Late Show with David Letterman to promote the album, including "Team". The track was also performed by Lorde during the ARIA Music Awards of 2013. At the 2014 MuchMusic Video Awards, Lorde performed a Goth-influenced medley of "Tennis Court" and "Team". American alternative rock band Local H recorded a cover version of "Team" at Electrical Audio in Chicago, Illinois. The Local H version was released as a single on 21 April 2014. J Gramm released a remix of "Team" in December 2013. Noisey'' gave the remix a positive review, stating that J Gramm "turns the ballad up a notch—with some triumphant drums and overall, a more victorious feel for the stories of the cities she's dreaming up." In November 2020, Chanel featured a cover of the song, performed by French actress Marion Cotillard, in their Chanel No. 5 perfume advertisement.

Track listing

Charts

Weekly charts

Year-end charts

Decade-end charts

Certifications

Release history

See also
 List of Adult Top 40 number-one songs of the 2010s

References

External links
 
 
 

2013 singles
2013 songs
2014 singles
APRA Award winners
Lorde songs
Local H songs
Songs written by Joel Little
New Zealand hip hop songs
Electronic dance music songs
Lava Records singles
Songs written by Lorde
Songs about New Zealand